Kim Namjo is a Korean poet.

Life
Kim Namjo was born on September 25, 1927, in Daegu, South Korea. She attended a girls' school in Kyushu, Japan, and graduated from Seoul National University's College of Education in 1951 with a degree in Korean Language Education. Kim made her official literary debut in 1950 while still in college, publishing the poetry collection Constellations. Kim taught at Masan High School and Ewha Girls' High School. She became a professor at Sookmyung Women's University in 1954 and is now a professor emerita there. Kim served as chairperson of Society of Korean Poets and is currently a member of the Korean Academy of Arts.

Work
Kim Namjo's poetry features dynamic use of sensual language and vibrant imagery to portray the subtlety of human emotions. Kim's work follows in the tradition of Mo Yunsuk and Noh Cheonmyeong. Kim's main theme was love, but not simply the love shared by a man and woman, but also the love shared between a human and the "Absolute Being.

The poems in her first poetry collection, Life (Moksum), offer both an affirmation of humanity and a passion for the vitality of life. These poems also present a harmonious balance between Catholic piety and an ardent human voice. The poems in Kim's second collection, Naadeuui hyangyu, and third collection place an increasingly heightened emphasis on religious faith, focusing much attention on the exploration of Christian humanism and ethics. Her later poems discard passion for restraint and perseverance as part of an ongoing religious self-examination. In the collection Winter Ocean (Gyeoul Bada), the poet  describes a world in which human emotions have attained absolute purity.

Works in translation
 Selected Poems of Kim Namjo - English (Kim Namjo Siseon), translated by David R. McCann and Hyunjae Yee Sallee
 Windtaufe - German (Baram serye)
 Песни сегодняшнего и завтрашнего дня - Russian (Oneul geurigo naeil-ui norae)
 Antologia poética - Spanish (Kim Namjo Siseonjib)
 Rain, Sky, Wind, Port - English (Codhill Press, 2014), translated by Hillel Schwartz and Sunny Jung

Works in Korean (Partial)
 Life (정념의 기)
 A Heart's Flag (정념의 기)
 Love's Cursive (사랑초서)
 Music of the Pine Woods (송림의 음악)
 For a While, and Forever (잠시, 그리고 영원히) 
 The Poems of Kim Namjo (김남조 시집)
 The Complete Poems of Kim Namjo (김남조 시전집)

Awards

 First Annual Association of Free Literature Prize (1958)
 May Literary Prize (1963)
 Prize for Poetry of Korean Poets Association (1974)
 The Culture and Arts Prize of the Republic of Korea (1988)
 Seoul City Cultural Award (1990)
 Samil Culture Award (1991)
 National Order of Merit (1993)
 Proud Artist Award - Contributions (2000)
 Manhae Prize (2007)
 Jeong Jiyong Literature Prize (2017)

See also
Korean literature
List of Korean-language poets
Society of Korean Poets

References 

1927 births
Korean writers
Living people
20th-century Korean poets
South Korean women poets
Jeong Jiyong Literature Prize winners
Society of Korean Poets Award winners
20th-century women writers
Seoul National University alumni
Academic staff of Sookmyung Women's University